Toussaint Rose (3 September 1611  – 6 January 1701) was a French court secretary to Cardinal Mazarin and Louis XIV of France.

Rose was born in Provins.  He was elected the second member to occupy seat 2 of the Académie française in 1675.  He died, aged 89, in Paris.

1611 births
1701 deaths
People from Provins
Members of the Académie Française
French male writers